Turing is the codename for a graphics processing unit (GPU) microarchitecture developed by Nvidia. It is named after the prominent mathematician and computer scientist Alan Turing. The architecture was first introduced in August 2018 at SIGGRAPH 2018 in the workstation-oriented Quadro RTX cards, and one week later at Gamescom in consumer GeForce RTX 20 series graphics cards. Building on the preliminary work of its HPC-exclusive predecessor, the Turing architecture introduces the first consumer products capable of real-time ray tracing, a longstanding goal of the computer graphics industry. Key elements include dedicated artificial intelligence processors ("Tensor cores") and dedicated ray tracing processors (“RT cores”). Turing leverages DXR, OptiX, and Vulkan for access to ray-tracing. In February 2019, Nvidia released the GeForce 16 series of GPUs, which utilizes the new Turing design but lacks the RT and Tensor cores.

Turing is manufactured using TSMC's 12 nm FinFET semiconductor fabrication process. The high-end TU102 GPU includes 18.6billion transistors fabricated using this process. Turing also uses GDDR6 memory from Samsung Electronics, and previously Micron Technology.

Details

The Turing microarchitecture combines multiple types of specialized processor core, and enables an implementation of limited real-time ray tracing. This is accelerated by the use of new RT (ray-tracing) cores, which are designed to process quadtrees and spherical hierarchies, and speed up collision tests with individual triangles.

Features in Turing:
 CUDA cores (SM, Streaming Multiprocessor)
 Compute Capability 7.5
 traditional rasterized shaders and compute
 concurrent execution of integer and floating point operations (inherited from Volta)
 Ray-tracing (RT) cores
 bounding volume hierarchy acceleration
 shadows, ambient occlusion, lighting, reflections
 Tensor (AI) cores
 artificial intelligence
 large matrix operations
 Deep Learning Super Sampling (DLSS)
 Memory controller with GDDR6/HBM2 support
DisplayPort 1.4a with Display Stream Compression (DSC) 1.2
 PureVideo Feature Set J hardware video decoding
 GPU Boost 4
 NVLink Bridge with VRAM stacking pooling memory from multiple cards
 VirtualLink VR
 NVENC hardware encoding

The GDDR6 memory is produced by Samsung Electronics for the Quadro RTX series. The RTX 20 series initially launched with Micron memory chips, before switching to Samsung chips by November 2018.

Rasterization
Nvidia reported rasterization (CUDA) performance gains for existing titles of approximately 30–50% over the previous generation.

Ray-tracing
The ray-tracing performed by the RT cores can be used to produce reflections, refractions and shadows, replacing traditional raster techniques such as cube maps and depth maps. Instead of replacing rasterization entirely, however, the information gathered from ray-tracing can be used to augment the shading with information that is much more photo-realistic, especially in regards to off-camera action. Nvidia said the ray-tracing performance increased about 8 times over the previous consumer architecture, Pascal.

Tensor cores
Generation of the final image is further accelerated by the Tensor cores, which are used to fill in the blanks in a partially rendered image, a technique known as de-noising. The Tensor cores perform the result of deep learning to codify how to, for example, increase the resolution of images generated by a specific application or game. In the Tensor cores' primary usage, a problem to be solved is analyzed on a supercomputer, which is taught by example what results are desired, and the supercomputer determines a method to use to achieve those results, which is then done with the consumer's Tensor cores. These methods are delivered via driver updates to consumers. The supercomputer uses a large number of Tensor cores itself.

Chips 

 TU102
 TU104
 TU106
 TU116
 TU117

Development

Turing's development platform is called RTX. RTX ray-tracing features can be accessed using Microsoft's DXR, OptiX, as well using Vulkan extensions (the last one being also available on Linux drivers). It includes access to AI-accelerated features through NGX. The Mesh Shader, Shading Rate Image functionalities are accessible using DX12, Vulkan and OpenGL extensions on Windows and Linux platforms.

Windows 10 October 2018 update includes the public release of DirectX Raytracing.

Products using Turing
 GeForce MX series
 GeForce MX450 (Mobile)
 GeForce MX550 (Mobile)
 GeForce 16 series
 GeForce GTX 1630
 GeForce GTX 1650 (Mobile)
 GeForce GTX 1650
 GeForce GTX 1650 Super
 GeForce GTX 1650 Ti (Mobile)
 GeForce GTX 1660
 GeForce GTX 1660 Super
 GeForce GTX 1660 Ti (Mobile)
 GeForce GTX 1660 Ti
 GeForce 20 series
 GeForce RTX 2060 (Mobile)
 GeForce RTX 2060
 GeForce RTX 2060 Super
 GeForce RTX 2070 (Mobile)
 GeForce RTX 2070
 GeForce RTX 2070 Super (Mobile)
 GeForce RTX 2070 Super
 GeForce RTX 2080 (Mobile)
 GeForce RTX 2080
 GeForce RTX 2080 Super (Mobile)
 GeForce RTX 2080 Super
 GeForce RTX 2080 Ti
 Titan RTX
 Nvidia Quadro
 Quadro RTX 3000 (Mobile)
 Quadro RTX 4000 (Mobile)
 Quadro RTX 4000
 Quadro RTX 5000 (Mobile)
 Quadro RTX 5000
 Quadro RTX 6000 (Mobile)
 Quadro RTX 6000
 Quadro RTX 8000
 Quadro RTX T400
 Quadro RTX T400 4GB
 Quadro RTX T600
 Quadro RTX T1000
 Quadro RTX T1000 8GB
 Nvidia Tesla
 Tesla T4

See also
 List of eponyms of Nvidia GPU microarchitectures
List of Nvidia graphics processing units
Volta (microarchitecture)

References

External links
Nvidia Turing GPU Architecture Whitepaper
Nvidia page about Turing
Nvidia blog about raytracing vs. rasterization
NVIDIA Turing Architecture In-Depth
Microsoft developer blog on DirectX Raytracing

Nvidia microarchitectures
Nvidia Turing
Computer-related introductions in 2018